Anacithara hervieri is a species of sea snail, a marine gastropod mollusk in the family Horaiclavidae.

Description
The length of the shell attains 5 mm, its diameter 2 mm.

(Original description) The small, elongate shell has a turreted shape. Its colour is dull white. The protoconch is pale primrose yellow. The shell contains six whorls. The ribs are low, distant, perpendicular, angled at the shoulder, running from suture to base, but not continuing from one whorl to another. They number seven on the penultimate whorl. The spirals are very slender and widely spaced threads, between which are a few still finer threads. Of the major series there are twelve on the last and four on the penultimate whorl. The open aperture is unarmed save for a tubercle on either side of the sinus. The varix is well developed. The sinus is wide and shallow. The siphonal canal is merely a notch.

Distribution
This marine species is endemic to Australia and occurs off Queensland.

References

External links
  Tucker, J.K. 2004 Catalog of recent and fossil turrids (Mollusca: Gastropoda). Zootaxa 682:1-1295.

hervieri
Gastropods of Australia
Gastropods described in 1922